Hamaticolax is a genus of parasitic copepods belonging to the family Bomolochidae. Its members can only be distinguished from the closely related genus Acantholochus by the presence of an accessory process on the claw of the maxillipeds. It includes the following species:
Hamaticolax attenuatus (C. B. Wilson, 1913)
Hamaticolax embiotocae (Hanan, 1976)
Hamaticolax galeichthyos (Luque & Bruno, 1990)
Hamaticolax maleus (Oldewage, 1994)
Hamaticolax occultus (Kabata, 1971)
Hamaticolax paralabracis (Luque & Bruno, 1990)
Hamaticolax prolixus (Cressey, 1969)
Hamaticolax scutigerulus (C. B. Wilson, 1935)
Hamaticolax spinulus (Cressey, 1969)
Hamaticolax unisagittatus (Tavares & Luque, 2003)

References

Poecilostomatoida